The 13th Wilno Uhlan Regiment was a unit of the Polish army during the interwar period and the Polish Defence War of 1939.

Origins
The ancestral units to the regiment were created mainly as means of defending the Polish interest and the interest of the ethnic Poles living in Kresy at the end of World War I. Russians, Poles, Ukrainians, Lithuanians, Belarusians, and even Anarchists competed for the sovereignty over the area.

Formation 
The 13th Regiment was formed out of the cavalry units of the Lithuanian and Belarusian Self-Defence on December 27, 1918, on the estate of a Mr. Pośpieszek. On December 28, the regiment was moved to the garrison at Vilnius and was stationed in the barracks in the Antokol district. , nom-de-guerre 'Dąb', lit. 'Oak', was the regiment's first commander. The regiment was the first in newly independent Poland, and was originally called the 1st Regiment of Wilno Uhlans. It became officially part of the Polish Armed Forces in June 1919, receiving its name and number.

In the official Polish Army documents, the phrase "Wilenskich" ("of Vilnius") was omitted; the official name was the 13th Regiment. In spite of this, the officers, soldiers and public persisted in calling it the "13th Wilno Regiment".

Lipka Tatar Tradition
Since the joining, the regiment had been following dual tradition of the afore-mentioned Lithuanian and Belarusian Self-Defence and of the 7th Lithuanian Tatar Regiment, which used to be stationed in Janów, the same place where over century later, the 13th Regiment fought its very first battle.

Polish-Soviet War
The 13th Regiment participated in the Polish–Soviet War of 1919–1920 and became known for many flanking manoeuvres and raids behind Soviet lines. It protected the retreat of General Żeligowski's troops. On 25 February 1920, while it was stationed in Vilnius, the regiment mutinied, because it refused to fight against Lithuanians.

On June 29, 1919, in Vilnius, General Edward Rydz-Śmigły handed over the regiment's new banner to a small delegation from a combat area. After a failed attempt at seizing territory in the Ukraine beyond Kiev, many soldiers from the disbanded Tatar Uhlan Regiment, (named after Colonel Mustafa Achmatowicz, a renowned eighteenth-century Lithuanian Tatar cavalryman), joined the "Wilno Regiment".

Interwar period
In late 1921, the regiment patrolled the Polish border with Lithuania and was stationed for a brief period in Głębokie, at present Hlybokaye in Belarus. The regiment was moved to Nowa Wilejka near Vilnius in 1922, where it stayed until the Invasion of Poland in 1939.

In 1936, a Tatar unit was created within the 13th Regiment of Wilno Uhlans. Captain Michał Bohdanowicz was the original commander. The unit was led for a short time by Captain Bazyli Marcisz and podpułkownik . Captain Aleksander Jeljaszewicz became its last commander from November 25, 1938. During the Regiment's Holiday on July 25, 1937, the squadron (or mounted infantry battalion) received a buńczuk made according to the old Tatar traditions and funded by the entire Tatar community of Poland. During the symbolic ceremony of the burial of the heart of Marshal Józef Piłsudski in the Rasos cemetery in Vilnius, a detail from the 1st Tatar Squadron fired a three-volley salute.

Banners and markings 
The regiment's lances initially bore pennons, but after 1936 these were only issued by personal request, when all cavalry units were transformed into mounted infantry units and were in the process of becoming fully mechanized divisions. However, progress was slow, only two fully mechanized units fought in the Invasion of Poland in 1939 besides armoured units, heavy artillery units, AA artillery units, Polish Air Force's ground units, and most of the tabors. Uniforms were adorned with miniature banners, pink in colour, with a slim cornflower-coloured stripe in the middle. Each trooper's rogatywka (hat) was adorned with a pink stripe running around the crown. The 1st Tatar Squadron also wore on the small banners, a golden Crescent Moon and star. The regiment's holiday was July 25 (in memory of the Battle of Janow in 1920).

The Uhlans in command 
 Major Władysław Dąbrowski (ur. 1891) (1918–1920)
 Colonel Eugeniusz Ślaski  (1920)
 Colonel Mścisław Butkiewicz  (1920–1922)
 Honorary Colonel Terencjusz O'Brien (1922)
 Colonel Tomasz Brzozowski (1922–1925)
 Colonel Aleksander Kunicki (1925–1927)
 Colonel (finished senior officers’ school) Adam Korytowski (XI 1927 – III 1930)
 Lieutenant Colonel (finished senior officers’ school) Czesław Chmielewski (1930–1937)
 Colonel Kazimierz Żelisławski (1937–1939)
 Lieutenant Colonel Józef Szostak (finished senior officers’ school) (1939)

A selection of Uhlan Officers
Lieutenant Ignacy Cieplak
Lieutenant Jerzy Cydzik

Invasion of Poland
In 1939, under the command of Lieutenant Colonel Józef Szostak, the 13th Regiment of Wilno Uhlans fought as a part of the Wileńska Cavalry Brigade under the command of Colonel Konstanty Drucki-Lubecki. Between September 2 and 5, the brigade took part in heavy fighting near Piotrków Trybunalski. On September 9 and 10, the brigade lost many men and much equipment while retreating across the Vistula river near Maciejowice. The brigade fought in Lubelszczyzna near the city of Lublin, before being crushed near Tomaszow Lubelski.

The largest remnant of the regiment became part of the Independent Operational Group Polesie under the command of Major General Franciszek Kleeberg.

Home Army

See also 
 Polish cavalry
 Lipka Tatars

Other non-Christian Polish Cavalry units 

 
 Colonel Berek Joselewicz

References

Sources 

Cavalry regiments of Poland
Wilno Voivodeship (1926–1939)
Military history of Vilnius
Polish Land Forces
Military units and formations established in 1918
Cavalry regiments of Central Lithuania

pl:Pułki kawalerii Wojska Polskiego